Cow Mountain Ridge is a ridge in Lake County, California and Mendocino County, California
It joins Cow Mountain from the south.

Location

Cow Mountain Ridge is in the Mayacamas Mountains of the northern California Coast Ranges.
It is in Lake and Mendocino counties.
Clear Lake is to the east and the Russian River Valley and Ukiah are to the west.
Eight Mile Valley on the east side of Cow Mountain Ridge holds a variety of native species in grasslands, oak woodlands, and areas of chaparral.

Name

Cow Mountain and Cow Mountain Ridge got their names from longhorn cattle introduced around 1839 by Salvador Vallejo and later ranched by Ben Kelsey and Andrew Kelsey, which left many rogue cattle roaming the countryside.
When settlers arrived in the land around Clear Lake about 1853 they did not want the long horn cattle to breed with their exotic cattle bred for meat production, so began a program of shooting the long horns.
Cow Mountain was one of they last refuges for the long horns, but they had been eliminated by the 1870s by the Hurt family of Scotts Valley.

Terrain

Mendo Rock Road runs along the top of the ridge.
From Mendo Rock there are dramatic views in all directions.

Notes

Sources

Mountains of Lake County, California